Panmah Glacier is a glacier in Gilgit-Baltistan, Pakistan. It is included in the Central Karakoram National Park.

See also
Central Karakoram National Park
List of glaciers
Panmah Muztagh

References 

Glaciers of Gilgit-Baltistan